Lössl is a German-language surname. It may refer to:
Claudia Lössl (born 1966), German actress
Jonas Lössl (born 1989), Danish professional footballer

References 

German-language surnames
Surnames of Austrian origin
Surnames of Bavarian origin